Orthostethus infuscatus is a species of click beetle in the family Elateridae.

References

Further reading

External links

 

Elateridae
Beetles described in 1844